The 2018 SheBelieves Cup was the third edition of the SheBelieves Cup, an invitational women's soccer tournament held in the United States. Featuring national teams from Germany, England, France, and hosts United States, it began on March 1 and ended on March 7, 2018, broadly running in parallel with the 2018 Algarve Cup, 2018 Turkish Women’s Cup, and the 2018 Cyprus Women's Cup.

The United States won the tournament.

Format
The four invited teams played a round-robin tournament. Points awarded in the group stage followed the standard formula of three points for a win, one point for a draw, and zero points for a loss. A tie in points was decided by goal differential.

Venues

Squads

Teams

Standings

Results
All times are local (UTC−5).

Goalscorers

References

2018
2018 in women's association football
2018 in American women's soccer
SheBelieves Cup
2018 in sports in Ohio
2018 in sports in New Jersey
2018 in sports in Florida
2017–18 in English women's football
2017–18 in French women's football
Soccer in Ohio
Soccer in New Jersey
Soccer in Florida
Sports competitions in Columbus, Ohio
Harrison, New Jersey
Sports competitions in Orlando, Florida